Luis Blanco may refer to:

 Luis Blanco Lugo (1921–1973), Puerto Rican judge
 Luis Manuel Blanco (born 1953), Argentine football manager of Mons Calpe and former forward
 Luis Blanco (footballer, born 1978), Spanish football manager of Espanyol and former forward
 Luis Blanco (footballer, born 1990), Andorran football midfielder for Santa Coloma